Frederick "Fred" Moore Vinson (January 22, 1890 – September 8, 1953) was an American attorney and politician who served as the 13th chief justice of the United States from 1946 until his death in 1953. Vinson was one of the few Americans to have served in all three branches of the U.S. government. Before becoming chief justice, Vinson served as a U.S. Representative from Kentucky from 1924 to 1928 and 1930 to 1938, as a federal appellate judge on the U.S. Court of Appeals for the District of Columbia Circuit from 1938 to 1943, and as the U.S. Secretary of the Treasury from 1945 to 1946. 

Born in Louisa, Kentucky, Vinson pursued a legal career and served in the U.S. Army during World War I. After the war, he served as the Commonwealth's Attorney for the Thirty-Second Judicial District of Kentucky before winning election to the U.S. House of Representatives in 1924. He lost re-election in 1928 but regained his seat in 1930 and served in Congress until 1937. During his time in Congress, he became an adviser and confidante of Missouri Senator Harry S. Truman. In 1937, President Franklin D. Roosevelt appointed Vinson to be a judge on the D.C. Circuit. Vinson resigned from the appellate court in 1943, when he became the Director of the Office of Economic Stabilization. After Truman acceded to the presidency following Roosevelt's death in 1945, Truman appointed Vinson to the position of Secretary of the Treasury. Vinson negotiated the payment of the Anglo-American loan and presided over the establishment of numerous post-war organizations, including the International Bank for Reconstruction and Development and the International Monetary Fund.

After the death of Chief Justice Harlan F. Stone in 1946, Truman appointed Vinson to the Supreme Court. Vinson dissented in the case of Youngstown Sheet & Tube Co. v. Sawyer, which ruled against the Truman administration's control of the nation's steel mills during a strike. He ordered a rehearing of the Briggs v. Elliott case, which was eventually combined into the case known as Brown v. Board of Education.

Early years

Vinson, known universally as Fred, was born in the newly built, eight-room, red brick house in front of the Lawrence County jail in Louisa, Kentucky, where his father served as the Lawrence County Jailer. As a child he would help his father in the jail and even made friends with prisoners who would remember his kindness when he later ran for public office. Vinson worked odd jobs while in school. He graduated from Kentucky Normal School in 1909  and enrolled at Centre College, where he graduated at the top of his class with a Bachelor of Arts degree. While at Centre, he was a member of the Kentucky Alpha Delta chapter of Phi Delta Theta fraternity. He received a Bachelor of Laws from the now defunct College of Law. He entered private practice in Louisa. He first ran for and was elected to office as the City Attorney of Louisa.

Vinson joined the Army during World War I. Following the war, he was elected as the Commonwealth's Attorney for the Thirty-Second Judicial District of Kentucky. Vinson married Julia Roberta Dixon on January 24, 1924 in Ashland, Kentucky. They had two sons.

United States Representative from Kentucky

In 1924, Vinson ran in a special election for his district's seat in Congress after William J. Fields resigned to become the Governor of Kentucky. Vinson was elected as a Democrat and then was reelected twice before losing in 1928. His loss was attributed to his refusal to dissociate his campaign from Alfred E. Smith's presidential campaign. However, Vinson came back to win re-election in 1930, and he served in Congress through 1937.

While he was in Congress he befriended Missouri Senator Harry S. Truman, a friendship that would last throughout his life. He soon became a close advisor, confidant, card player, and dear friend to Truman. After Truman decided against running for another term as president in the early 1950s, he tried to convince a skeptical Vinson to seek the Democratic Party nomination, but Vinson turned down the President's offer. After being equally unsuccessful in enlisting General Dwight D. Eisenhower, President Truman eventually landed on Governor of Illinois Adlai Stevenson as his preferred successor in the 1952 presidential election.

In 1930, former congressman Vinson moved his law practice from Louisa, Kentucky thirty miles north to Ashland. With aspirations to return to Washington, D.C. as congressman, Vinson formed a circle of Ashland friends who could aid him politically and professionally. This group included his next door neighbor Paul G. Blazer. Vinson returned to Washington, D.C. as congressman in 1931. Vinson would become a frontline supporter of President Roosevelt and his cabinet's New Deal revolution.

United States Court of Appeals

Vinson was nominated by President Franklin D. Roosevelt on November 26, 1937, to an Associate Justice seat on the United States Court of Appeals for the District of Columbia (now the United States Court of Appeals for the District of Columbia Circuit) vacated by Associate Justice Charles Henry Robb. He was confirmed by the United States Senate on December 9 of that year, and received his commission six days later. He was designated by Chief Justice Harlan F. Stone to serve as Chief Judge of the Emergency Court of Appeals. His service terminated on May 28, 1943, due to his resignation.

Secretary of the Treasury

Vinson resigned from the bench to become Director of the Office of Economic Stabilization, an executive agency charged with fighting inflation. He also spent time as Federal Loan Administrator (March 6 to April 3, 1945) and director of War Mobilization and Reconversion (April 4 to July 22, 1945). He was appointed United States Secretary of the Treasury by President Truman and served from July 23, 1945, to June 23, 1946.

His mission as Secretary of the Treasury was to stabilize the American economy during the last months of the war and to adapt the United States financial position to the drastically changed circumstances of the postwar world. Before the war ended, Vinson directed the last of the great war-bond drives.

At the end of the war, he negotiated payment of the British Loan of 1946, the largest loan made by the United States to another country ($3.75 billion), and the lend-lease settlements of economic and military aid given to the allies during the war. In order to encourage private investment in postwar America, he promoted a tax cut in the Revenue Act of 1945. He also supervised the inauguration of the International Bank for Reconstruction and Development and the International Monetary Fund, both created at the Bretton Woods Conference of 1944, acting as the first chairman of their respective boards. In 1946, Vinson resigned from the Treasury to be appointed Chief Justice of the United States by Truman.

Chief Justice

Vinson was nominated by President Harry S. Truman on June 6, 1946, to become Chief Justice of the United States, following the death of Harlan F. Stone. Vinson was recommended to Truman by former chief justice Charles Evans Hughes and former associate justice Owen Roberts. Both noted Vinson's experience in all three branches of the federal government, with Hughes telling Truman, "You have a Secretary of the Treasury who has been a Congressman, a Judge of the Court of Appeal, and an executive officer in President Roosevelt's and your cabinets". He was confirmed by the United States Senate by a voice vote on June 20, 1946, received his commission on June 21, and took the oath of office on June 24. His appointment came at a time when the Supreme Court was deeply fractured, both intellectually and personally. One faction was led by Justice Hugo Black, the other by Justice Felix Frankfurter. Vinson was credited with patching this fracture, at least on a personal level. He was the presiding officer of the Conference of Senior Circuit Judges (now the Judicial Conference of the United States) from 1946 to 1948, and presiding officer of the Judicial Conference of the United States from 1948 to 1953. He served as Circuit Justice for the Fourth Circuit and the District of Columbia Circuit from June 26, 1946, to September 8, 1953. His service ended with his death on September 8, 1953.

In his time on the Supreme Court, he wrote 77 opinions for the court and 13 dissents. His most dramatic dissent was when the court voided President Truman's seizure of the steel industry during a strike in a June 3, 1952, decision, Youngstown Sheet & Tube Co. v. Sawyer. His final public appearance at the court was when he read the decision not to review the conviction and death sentence of Julius and Ethel Rosenberg. After Justice William O. Douglas granted a stay of execution to the Rosenbergs at the last moment, Chief Justice Vinson sent special flights out to bring vacationing justices back to Washington in order to ensure the execution of the Rosenbergs. During his tenure as Chief Justice, one of his law clerks was future Associate Justice Byron White.

The major issues his court dealt with included racial segregation, labor unions, communism and loyalty oaths. On racial segregation, he wrote that states practicing the separate but equal doctrine must provide facilities that were truly equal, in Sweatt v. Painter and McLaurin v. Oklahoma State Regents. The case of Briggs v. Elliott was before the Court at the time of his death. Vinson, not wanting a 5–4 decision, had ordered a second hearing of the case. He died before the case could be reheard, and his vote may have been pivotal, q.v., discussion of Brown in Felix Frankfurter. Upon his death, Earl Warren was appointed to the Court and the case was heard again.

As Chief Justice, he swore in Harry S. Truman and Dwight D. Eisenhower as President.

Potential cabinet position
When Secretary of State Dean Acheson came under fire from congressional Republicans for being "soft on communism" at the end of 1950 Vinson was briefly mentioned as the new Secretary of State and Dean Acheson as the new chief justice. This speculation died down when President Truman retained Acheson at the State Department.

Death and legacy
Vinson died on September 8, 1953, of a heart attack at his Washington home. His body was interred in Pinehill Cemetery in Louisa, Kentucky.

An extensive collection of Vinson's personal and judicial papers is archived at the University of Kentucky in Lexington, where they are available for research.

A portrait of Vinson hangs in the hallway of the chapter house of the Kentucky Alpha-Delta chapter of Phi Delta Theta (ΦΔΘ) international fraternity, at Centre College. Vinson was a member of the chapter in his years at Centre. Affectionately known as "Dead Fred", the portrait is taken by fraternity members to Centre football and basketball games and other events.

The Fred M. Vinson Birthplace, in Louisa, Kentucky, is listed on the National Register of Historic Places.

See also

Demographics of the Supreme Court of the United States
List of justices of the Supreme Court of the United States
List of United States Supreme Court justices by time in office
List of law clerks of the Supreme Court of the United States (Chief Justice)
United States Supreme Court cases during the Vinson Court

Notes

References

Further reading

 Abraham, Henry J., Justices and Presidents: A Political History of Appointments to the Supreme Court. 3d. ed. (New York: Oxford University Press, 1992). .
 Cushman, Clare, The Supreme Court Justices: Illustrated Biographies,1789-1995 (2nd ed.)  (Supreme Court Historical Society), (Congressional Quarterly Books, 2001) ; .
 Frank, John P., The Justices of the United States Supreme Court: Their Lives and Major Opinions (Leon Friedman and Fred L. Israel, editors) (Chelsea House Publishers: 1995) , .
 Hall, Kermit L., ed. The Oxford Companion to the Supreme Court of the United States. New York: Oxford University Press, 1992. ; .
 Martin, Fenton S. and Goehlert, Robert U., The U.S. Supreme Court: A Bibliography, (Congressional Quarterly Books, 1990). .
 Pritchett, C. Herman, Civil Liberties and the Vinson Court. (The University of Chicago Press, 1969) ; .
 St. Clair, James E., and Gugin, Linda C., Chief Justice Fred M. Vinson of Kentucky: A Political Biography (University Press of Kentucky: 2002) ; .
 Symposium, In Memoriam: Chief Justice Fred M. Vinson, 49 Northwestern University Law Review 1–75, (1954).
 Urofsky, Melvin I., Division and Discord: The Supreme Court under Stone and Vinson, 1941-1953 (University of South Carolina Press, 1997) .
 Urofsky, Melvin I., The Supreme Court Justices: A Biographical Dictionary (New York: Garland Publishing 1994).  590 pp. ; .

External links

 
 
 
 Biography, at the U.S. Treasury Office of the Curator.
 Truman Presents Supreme Court Chief Justice Vinson With Historic Gavel, 1948 Shapell Manuscript Foundation
 Chief Justice Vinson dies of Heart Attack, The New York Times, September 8, 1953.
 Obituary, NY Times, September 9, 1953, Vinson Excelled In Federal Posts.
 Oyez Project, Fred M. Vinson, United States Supreme Court.
 Supreme Court Historical Society, The Vinson Court.

|-

|-

|-

|-

|-

|-

|-

1890 births
1953 deaths
20th-century American judges
20th-century American politicians
Methodists from Kentucky
United States Army personnel of World War I
American prosecutors
Articles containing video clips
Centre College alumni
Chief justices of the United States
Democratic Party members of the United States House of Representatives from Kentucky
Judges of the United States Court of Appeals for the D.C. Circuit
Kentucky Commonwealth's Attorneys
Kentucky lawyers
Kentucky state court judges
People from Louisa, Kentucky
Truman administration cabinet members
United States court of appeals judges appointed by Franklin D. Roosevelt
United States federal judges appointed by Harry S. Truman
United States Secretaries of the Treasury